Gerlosberg is a municipality in the Schwaz district in the Austrian state of Tyrol.

Geography
Gerlosberg lies east of Rohrberg. In the southern part of the municipality, the Gerlos brook flows through a deep gorge. In the north, the elevation rises to the 2558 meter Kreuzjoch.

References

Cities and towns in Schwaz District